Devil's Island is a 1996 Icelandic film directed by Friðrik Þór Friðriksson. It is a dark comedy filmed in the Grótta area of South west Iceland. The story depicts a group of otherwise homeless families living in barracks abandoned by the US Air Force after the Second World War. The film was selected as the Icelandic entry for the Best Foreign Language Film at the 69th Academy Awards, but was not accepted as a nominee.

The film's themes include an ambivalence towards America and Americans, poverty and the accompanying social stigma, superstition and the spirit world, and a destructive family dynamic. The sound-track combines American pop (some of it performed in Icelandic) and a score by Hilmar Örn Hilmarsson.

Cast 
Baltasar Kormákur as Baddi
Gísli Halldórsson as Thomas
Sigurveig Jónsdóttir as Karolina
Halldóra Geirharðsdóttir as Dolly
Guðmundur Ólafsson as Grettir
Sveinn Geirsson as Danni

See also
 List of submissions to the 69th Academy Awards for Best Foreign Language Film
 List of Icelandic submissions for the Academy Award for Best Foreign Language Film

References

External links

 'Djöflaeyjan rís': article in Morgunblaðinu 1996
 'Braggadagar': article in Morgunblaðinu 1996

1996 films
1996 comedy films
Films directed by Friðrik Þór Friðriksson
Films scored by Hilmar Örn Hilmarsson
Icelandic comedy films
Films produced by Peter Aalbæk Jensen